Monolithic Baby! is the sixth studio album by American rock band Monster Magnet, released in 2004. It is a follow-up to 2000's God Says No. It would also be the first album featuring bassist Jim Baglino. Bob Pantella was hired to fill the band's drum position after the album's recording; the drums on the album were performed by Michael Wildwood.

The album features three cover songs – "There's No Way Out of Here" by Ken Baker. The song was originally recorded by Baker's English country rock band Unicorn released in 1976 on their album Too Many Crooks (US title Unicorn 2). David Gilmour also recorded a version on his solo debut album. "The Right Stuff" by Robert Calvert is from his 1974 concept album, Captain Lockheed and the Starfighters, and Velvet Underground's "Venus in Furs", the latter being available on the US edition of the album only.

Monolithic Baby! reached No. 13 in the German Charts.

Track listing
All tracks written by Dave Wyndorf except where noted.
 "Slut Machine" – 3:28
 "Supercruel" – 3:40
 "On the Verge" – 5:54
 "Unbroken (Hotel Baby)" – 3:42
 "Radiation Day" – 4:56
 "Monolithic" – 4:39
 "The Right Stuff" (Robert Calvert) (Robert Calvert cover) – 4:32
 "There's No Way Out of Here" (Ken Baker) (Unicorn cover) – 4:10
 "Master of Light" – 4:45
 "Too Bad" – 3:33
 "Ultimate Everything" – 7:26
 "CNN War Theme" – 3:35
 "King of Mars 2004" (bonus track) - 4:27
 "Venus in Furs" (Velvet Underground cover; bonus track) - 4:51

Tracks 13 and 14 are US bonus tracks. "King of Mars 2004" is a re-recording of the track "King of Mars" from Dopes to Infinity, and "Venus in Furs" is a The Velvet Underground cover from their 1967 album The Velvet Underground & Nico.

Special edition
Some special edition copies contain the two bonus tracks mentioned above and a bonus DVD with an interview with the band, live performances, and the uncensored music videos for "Unbroken (Hotel Baby)" and "The Right Stuff".

Personnel 
 Dave Wyndorf – vocals, guitar
 Ed Mundell – lead guitar
 Phil Caivano – guitar
 Jim Baglino – bass
 Michael Wildwood – drums

Chart positions

Weekly charts

References 

Monster Magnet albums
2004 albums
Albums produced by Scott Humphrey
SPV/Steamhammer albums